Neath Port Talbot Steelers were a rugby league team based in Port Talbot, West Glamorgan. They played in the Welsh Premier division of the Rugby League Conference at Aberavon Green Stars RFC.

History
Aberavon Fighting Irish were formed in 2003 and joined the newly formed Welsh division of the Rugby League Conference.

The club rebranded as Neath Port Talbot Steelers in 2007. The Steelers soldiered through many storms only to record two wins during the league fixtures, however, this was enough to cement a place in the first round of the play-offs. They turned over Torfaen Tigers to progress to the semi-final against the Titans in Newport. The match against the Titans however, proved to be a bridge too far as the Steelers were well beaten on the day.

The 2008 campaign was to be of a different set of fortunes for the Steelers. A lot of work had been made to see an improvement, with better standing in the league and a step forward, however with much disruption off the field with many players out injured for most, and in some cases, the entire season and a couple away with international duty and losing key backroom staff for some of the season, it took its toll on the field. Only one win was recorded in what was a long and hard-fought season.

The 2009 season saw them only one game in the whole campaign. They were struck with ground issues and injuries which led them to have the worst season in history. The junior sides had very good seasons with the U15's winning the league, and the U17's coming runners-up. This will put the Steelers in good sted for the future.

The 2010 season was slow starting due to the league kicking off late as several West Wales clubs failed to complete any fixtures. The Steelers narrowly lost the first two fixture against Merthyr Wildcats and Dyffryn Devils, then with a late recruitment push dominated the remaining fixtures with good wins over Torfaen Tigers and revenge over Dyffryn Devils, the Wildacts couldn't play the repeat fixture to union players having commitments. The grand final was the Steelers versus Tigers where the Steelmen won 42-10 at the Gnoll.

Players earning International Caps while at Aberavon Fighting Irish/Neath Port Talbot Steelers

 Neil Davies won a cap(s) for Wales while at Aberavon Fighting Irish 2004…2005 1(2?)-caps + 2-caps (sub)
 Richard Johnston won caps for Wales while at Aberavon Fighting Irish 2005…2006 (3?)4-caps 3(2?)-tries 12(8?)-points

Club honours
 RLC Welsh regional: 2010

Juniors
Neath Port Talbot Steelers' junior teams take part in the Welsh Conference Junior League.

External links
 Official site
 Official Wales Rugby League Website

Defunct rugby league teams in Wales
Rugby League Conference teams
Rugby league in Wales
Sport in Port Talbot
Welsh rugby league teams
Rugby clubs established in 2003
2003 establishments in Wales